Mordellistena ploiaria is a species of beetle in the genus Mordellistena of the family Mordellidae. It was described by Ray in 1949.

References

Beetles described in 1949
ploiaria